The Charles Goodyear Medal is the highest honor conferred by the American Chemical Society, Rubber Division.  Established in 1941, the award is named after Charles Goodyear, the discoverer of vulcanization, and consists of a gold medal, a framed certificate and prize money.  The medal honors individuals for "outstanding invention, innovation, or development which has resulted in a significant change or contribution to the nature of the rubber industry".  Awardees give a lecture at an ACS Rubber Division meeting, and publish a review of their work in the society's scientific journal Rubber Chemistry and Technology.

Recipients

Source:

 1941 David Spence – Diamond Rubber Co. researcher noted for synthesizing isoprene for use in synthetic rubber
 1942 Lorin B. Sebrell – Goodyear Research Director noted for his work on organic accelerators for vulcanization
 1944 Waldo L. Semon – early developer of synthetic rubber, in particular Ameripol for B. F. Goodrich
 1946 Ira Williams – duPont developer of Neoprene
 1948 George Oenslager – B. F. Goodrich chemist known for pioneering vulcanization accelerator chemistry
 1949 Harry L. Fisher – 69th national president of the American Chemical Society, and an authority on the chemistry of vulcanization

 1950 Carroll C. Davis – first editor of Rubber Chemistry and Technology, serving from 1928 to 1957, and developer of the first practical oxygen-aging test in the industry and the use of antioxidants in rubber
 1951 William C. Geer – B. F. Goodrich pioneer in studying rubber ageing, and developer of early aircraft de-icing systems
 1952 Howard E. Simmons – Dupont chemist that discovered the Simmons–Smith reaction
 1953 John T. Blake – Research director at Simplex Wire and Cable company, pioneered understanding of rubber as an electrical insulator
 1954 George S. Whitby – Head of the University of Akron rubber laboratory, for many years the only teacher of rubber chemistry in the USA
 1955 Ray P. Dinsmore – Goodyear pioneer of the use of rayon as a reinforcing material in auto tires
 1956 Sidney M. Cadwell – United States Rubber Company researcher noted as discoverer of antioxidants for rubber.
 1957 Arthur W. Carpenter – past president of ASTM, known for contributions to quality control for rubber
 1958 Joseph C. Patrick – Thiokol Chemical Company inventor of first American synthetic elastomer – Thiokol (polymer)
 1959 Fernley H. Banbury – Farrel Corporation executive and inventor of the Banbury mixer

 1960 William B. Wiegand – researcher at Columbian Carbon Co. who demonstrated the effect of carbon black particle size on rubber reinforcement
 1961 Herbert A. Winkelmann – B. F. Goodrich developer of first commercially feasible antioxidant
 1962 Melvin Mooney – United States Rubber Company physicist and rheologist responsible for the Mooney viscometer and the Mooney-Rivlin solid constitutive relation
 1963 William J. Sparks – Exxon chemist and co-inventor of Butyl rubber
 1964 Arthur E. Juve – B. F. Goodrich Director of Technology who developed oil-resistant rubber compositions, lab tests for tire treads, and improvements in manufacture of rubber products and the processing of synthetic rubber
 1965 Benjamin S. Garvey - worked for B.F. Goodrich and Pennsalt Chemicals. Dr. Garvey developed the "10 Gram Evaluation Process."
 1966 Edward A. Murphy – Dunlop researcher credited with invention of latex foam, first marketed as Dunlopillo
 1967 Norman Bekkedahl - pioneered understanding of Glass transition in elastomers, and former Deputy Chief of the Polymers Division at the National Bureau of Standards
 1968 Paul J. Flory – Cornell University pioneer in the physical chemistry of macromolecules, later a Nobel laureate
 1969 Robert M. Thomas – Exxon chemist and co-inventor of Butyl rubber

 1970 Samuel D. Gehman – Goodyear physicist noted for development of a modulus-based measurement of rubber's glass transition temperature
 1971 Harold J. Osterhof - inventor of Pliofilm, a plasticized rubber hydrochloride cast film, and director of research at Goodyear Tire & Rubber Co.
 1972 Frederick W. Stavely - Firestone researcher responsible for development of synthetic polyisoprene a.k.a. "coral rubber"
 1973 Arnold M. Collins – polychloroprene developer at DuPont
 1974 Joseph C. Krejci – Phillips researcher known for developing oil furnace method to make carbon black
 1975 Otto Bayer – head of the research group at IG Farben that discovered the polyaddition for the synthesis of polyurethanes out of polyisocyanate and polyol
 1976 Earl L. Warrick – Dow Corning pioneer of silicone elastomer chemistry and inventor of Silly Putty
 1977 James D. D'Ianni – Goodyear scientist noted for contributions in the development of synthetic rubber
 1978 Frank Herzegh – Goodrich inventor of the first successful tubeless tire and owner of patents for over 100 inventions in the field of tire technology
 1979 Francis P. Baldwin – Exxon Chief Scientist noted for his work on chemical modifications of low functionality elastomers

 1980 Samuel E. Horne, Jr. – Goodrich chemist who first polymerized synthetic polyisoprene using Ziegler catalyst
 1981 John D. Ferry – University of Wisconsin–Madison chemistry professor noted for co-authoring the Williams–Landel–Ferry equation
 1982 Adolf Schallamach – MRPRA researcher who pioneered understanding of the mechanisms of tire traction, abrasion and wear
 1983 J. Reid Shelton – professor at Case Western University known for contributions to understanding of oxidation and antioxidants in rubber, and for application of laser-Raman spectroscopy to the study of sulfur vulcanization
 1984 Herman E. Schroeder – R&D Director at DuPont and a pioneer in the development of tire cord adhesion and specialty elastomers
 1985 Maurice Morton – Inaugural director of the Institute of Rubber Research at the University of Akron
 1986 Leonard Mullins – MRPRA research director who first described the effect of prior overloads on rubber's stress-strain curve (i.e. the Mullins effect)
 1987 Norman R. Legge – Shell Oil Company researcher and pioneer of thermoplastic elastomers
 1988 Herman F. Mark – Polytechnic Institute of Brooklyn faculty known as the "father of polymer science" for his early work focused on the crystal structure of natural rubber and other polymers 
 1989 Jean-Marie Massoubre – Michelin researcher associated with early development of the radial tire

 1990 Alan N. Gent – University of Akron professor who contributed to understanding adhesion physics, and fracture of rubbery, crystalline and glassy polymers
 1991 Edwin J. Vandenberg – chemist at Hercules Inc. known for discovery of isotactic polypropylene and the development of Ziegler-type catalysts
 1992 Ronald S. Rivlin – MRPRA physicist and developer of finite elasticity theory for elastomers
 1993 Leo Mandelkern – Florida State University Distinguished Professor of Chemistry, pioneered understanding of crystallization in polymers
 1994 Alan G. Thomas – MRPRA physicist and developer of fracture mechanics theory for elastomers
 1995 Aubert Y. Coran – Monsanto researcher responsible for invention of thermoplastic elastomer Geolast
 1996 Siegfried Wolff – Degussa scientist who first recognized the potential for using silica in tire treads to reduce rolling resistance
 1997 Adel F. Halasa – Goodyear scientist who developed a terpolymer rubber of styrene, isoprene and butadiene (SIBR) that was used in the Aquatred tire 
 1998 Jean-Baptiste Donnet – CNRS pioneer in surface chemistry of carbon black
 1999 James E. Mark – University of Cincinnati pioneer in molecular dynamics computer simulations of rubber elasticity

 2000 Jack L. Koenig – Case Western Reserve University professor who pioneered spectroscopic methods of polymer characterization
 2001 Yasuyuki Tanaka – Tokyo University of Agriculture and Technology professor noted for elucidating the molecular structure of natural rubber
 2003 Graham J. Lake – former pro cricketer and MRPRA pioneer in understanding fatigue behavior of rubber
 2006 Robert F. Landel –  Caltech Jet Propulsion Laboratory physical chemist noted for co-authoring the Williams–Landel–Ferry equation
 2007 Karl A. Grosch – Uniroyal scientist who pioneered in the study of friction and abrasion in relation to tire traction and wear
 2008 Joseph P. Kennedy – University of Akron Polymer Science professor and inventor of the polystyrene-polyisobutylene-polystyrene triblock polymeric coating on the Taxus Drug-eluting stent 
 2009 James L. White – University of Akron Polymer Engineering professor who developed numerical models of rubber rheological behavior in batch and continuous mixing machines
 2010 Edward Kresge – Exxon Chief Polymer Scientist who developed tailored molecular weight density EPDM elastomers
 2011 Joseph Kuczkowski – Goodyear chemist who elucidated mechanisms of antioxidant function, resulting in the commercialization of several new antioxidant systems 
 2012 C. Michael Roland – Naval Research Lab scientist recognized for blast and impact protection using elastomers, and for diverse contributions to elastomer science
 2013 Russell A. Livigni – Gencorp scientist known for discovery and development of barium-based catalysts for the polymerization of butadiene and its copolymerization with styrene to give high trans rubbers with low vinyl content
 2014 Alan D. Roberts – TARRC physicist noted for contributions to understanding friction and contact in elastomers, in particular the JKR equation
 2015 Sudhin Datta – ExxonMobil Chemical scientist noted for development of Vistamaxx propylene-based elastomers.
 2016 Georg Bohm- Bridgestone scientist noted for development of electron beam pre-curing of elastomers
 2017 Judit Puskas – Ohio State University scientist noted as co-inventor of the polymer used on the Taxus-brand coronary stent
2018 Eric Baer – Case Western Reserve University professor noted for contributions to understanding elastomeric polyolefins and rubber toughening of brittle polymers, and for founding the university's Department of Macromolecular Science and Engineering.
2019 Roderic Quirk – University of Akron professor noted for contributions to anionic polymerization technology that is used to produce butadiene, isoprene and styrene homo and block copolymers.
 2020 Nissim Calderon – Goodyear Tire & Rubber Company researcher who first demonstrated olefin metathesis and later applied it to development of new elastomers, copolymers, terpolymers, alternating copolymers and oligomers.
 2021 Joseph DeSimone – American chemist, inventor, entrepreneur and co-founder of Carbon, the 3D Manufacturing company that commercialized his Continuous Liquid Interface Production (CLIP) technology.
 2022 Timothy B. Rhyne and Steven M. Cron – Michelin engineers who jointly invented and developed non-pneumatic tire technology for the Tweel and Uptis tires.
2023 Christopher Macosko - University of Minnesota professor emeritus who invented a rheometer for the rubber industry and co-founded Rheometric Scientific.

See also

 List of engineering awards
 List of chemistry awards
 International Rubber Science Hall of Fame: Another ACS award
 Melvin Mooney Distinguished Technology Award
 Sparks-Thomas award

References

External links
 The ACS Rubber Division
 Oral histories of several medal winners

Awards of the American Chemical Society
Awards established in 1941
Materials science awards
Chemical engineering awards
Rubber industry